Joëlle Smits (born 7 February 2000) is a Dutch professional footballer who plays as a striker for Eredivisie club PSV and the Netherlands national team.

Club career
Smits started her youth career with OJC Rosmalen at the age of six. She spent eight years there playing alongside boys before moving to Brabant United. In 2015, she moved to CTO Eindhoven.

In May 2017, Smits signed her first professional contract with Eredivisie club Twente. She made her debut on 1 September in a 3–0 league win against Zwolle. She scored in 58th minute of the game before being replaced by Bente Jansen. She scored 25 goals from 21 league matches during the 2018–19 season to help her club win the league title.

In February 2019, it was confirmed that Smits would join PSV prior to the 2019–20 season. She was the league top scorer when football leagues across Netherlands were suspended by Dutch government in March 2020 due to COVID-19 pandemic in the Netherlands.

On 15 September 2020, German Frauen-Bundesliga club VfL Wolfsburg announced that Smits has signed a three-year contract with the club which would be valid from 1 July 2021. On 5 June 2021, she played her last match for PSV in the cup final against ADO Den Haag. She scored the only goal in the match to win PSV's first trophy in their history. With 52 goals from 45 matches, Smits left the club as PSV's all-time top scorer.

During her only season with Wolfsburg, Smits won German league and domestic cup titles. On 3 June 2022, her contract with the club was terminated by mutual agreement. She returned to her former club PSV on the same day, where she signed a three-year contract until June 2025.

International career
Smits is a former Dutch youth international and has represented her nation with different age level teams. On 21 October 2016, she scored seven goals in her team's 11–0 win against Bulgaria during 2017 UEFA Women's Under-17 Championship qualifiers. She was also part of Netherlands under-19 team which reached semi-finals of UEFA Women's Under-19 Championship in 2017 and 2019. With 33 goals from 38 matches, she is all-time leading appearance maker and all-time top scorer of under-19 team.

Smits made her senior team debut on 4 March 2020 in a friendly against Brazil. She came on as an 84th-minute substitute for Vivianne Miedema as the match ended in a goalless draw. On 16 June 2021, Smits was named as a stand-by player for 2020 Olympics. On 20 July, she was added to the final squad as a replacement for injured Sherida Spitse.

Career statistics

Club

International

Scores and results list Netherlands' goal tally first, score column indicates score after each Smits goal.

Honours

Club
Twente
 Eredivisie: 2018–19

PSV
 KNVB Women's Cup: 2020–21

VfL Wolfsburg
 Frauen-Bundesliga: 2021–22
 DFB-Pokal Frauen: 2021–22

Individual
 Eredivisie top scorer: 2018–19, 2020–21

References

Further reading
 Grainey, Timothy (2012), Beyond Bend It Like Beckham: The Global Phenomenon of Women's Soccer, University of Nebraska Press, 
 Postma, Annemarie (2017), De Oranje leeuwinnen: het Nederlands vrouweneftal, Ambo/Anthos B.V., 
 Vissers, Willem (2019), Meisjesdromen: van EK-debuut tot WK-finale in tien jaar, Overamstel Uitgevers,

External links
 
Senior national team profile at Onsoranje.nl (in Dutch)
Under-23 national team profile at Onsoranje.nl (in Dutch)
Under-20 national team profile at Onsoranje.nl (in Dutch)
Under-19 national team profile at Onsoranje.nl (in Dutch)
Under-17 national team profile at Onsoranje.nl (in Dutch)
Under-16 national team profile at Onsoranje.nl (in Dutch)
Under-15 national team profile at Onsoranje.nl (in Dutch)

2000 births
Living people
Dutch women's footballers
Netherlands women's international footballers
Eredivisie (women) players
Frauen-Bundesliga players
FC Twente (women) players
PSV (women) players
VfL Wolfsburg (women) players
Dutch expatriate women's footballers
Dutch expatriate sportspeople in Germany
Expatriate women's footballers in Germany
Footballers at the 2020 Summer Olympics
Olympic footballers of the Netherlands
Women's association footballers not categorized by position
Sportspeople from 's-Hertogenbosch
Footballers from North Brabant